Tweed Heads South is a suburb located on the Tweed River in the Northern Rivers region of New South Wales, Australia, in the Tweed Shire.

Demographics
The median age of the Tweed Heads South population was 52 years, 15 years above the national median of 37.  72.3% of people living in Tweed Heads South were born in Australia. The other top responses for country of birth were England 8.4%, New Zealand 3.5%, Scotland 1%, China 0.8%, Philippines 0.7%.  89.5% of people spoke only English at home; the next most common languages were 0.6% Mandarin, 0.3% Tagalog, 0.3% German, 0.3% Cantonese, 0.3% Thai.

Sport and recreation 
A number of well-known sporting teams represent the local area, including South Tweed RLFC and South Tweed Heads Colts Junior Cricket Club who play home games at Dave Burns Field. Tweed United Soccer Club is a men's and women's junior and senior soccer club based at Arkinstall Park. South Tweed Skatepark is also located in Tweed Heads South next to Tweed River High School on Heffron Street.

References 

Towns in New South Wales